Crop and Pasture Science is an international peer-reviewed scientific journal published by CSIRO Publishing. It publishes outcomes of strategic research in crop and pasture sciences and the sustainability of farming systems. The primary focus is broad-scale cereals, grain legumes, oilseeds and pastures as well as on experimental approaches from molecular level to whole systems.

The current Editors-in-Chief are Sergio Atienza (Consejo Superior de Investigaciones Científicas, Spain) and Zed Rengel (University of Western Australia).

Abstracting and indexing 
The journal is abstracted in AGRICOLA, Australian Bibliography of Agriculture, Elsevier BIOBASE, BIOSIS, CAB Abstracts, Chemical Abstracts, Current Contents (Agriculture, Biology & Environmental Sciences), Kew Index, Science Citation Index, Scopus and TEEAL.

Impact factor 
According to the Journal Citation Reports, the journal has a 2015 impact factor of 1.488.

References

External links 
 

Agricultural journals
CSIRO Publishing academic journals
English-language journals
Monthly journals
Publications established in 1950
1950 establishments in Australia